Noé Roth (born 27 December 2000) is a Swiss freestyle skier. He competed in the 2018 Winter Olympics.

He participated at the FIS Freestyle Ski and Snowboarding World Championships 2019, winning a medal.

His mother is Colette Brand, Swiss freestyle skier and Olympic medalist.

References

External links

2000 births
Living people
Freestyle skiers at the 2018 Winter Olympics
Freestyle skiers at the 2022 Winter Olympics
Swiss male freestyle skiers
Olympic freestyle skiers of Switzerland
21st-century Swiss people